Pedro Rebolledo (born 17 December 1960) is a former professional tennis player from Chile. He achieved a career-high singles ranking of world No. 36 in 1982. Rebolledo won three career ATP singles titles.

Rebolledo participated in 17 Davis Cup ties for Chile from 1981 to 1992, posting a 19–11 record in singles and a 1–1 record in doubles.

Career finals

Singles (3 titles, 2 runner-ups)

Doubles (1 title)

External links
 
 
 

1960 births
Living people
Chilean male tennis players
Tennis players from Santiago